Wüst cabinet may refer to:

 First Wüst cabinet, North Rhine-Westphalia state government 2021-2022
 Second Wüst cabinet, North Rhine-Westphalia state government since 2022